Bar Aftab-e Khonk (also Romanized as Bar Āftāb-e Khonk; also known as Bar Āftāb-e Khong and Bar Āftāb-e Khonj) is a village in Armand Rural District, in the Central District of Lordegan County, Chaharmahal and Bakhtiari Province, Iran. At the 2006 census, its population was 42, in 8 families.

References 

Populated places in Lordegan County